Edwilson de Lima Florêncio (born 28 March 1980 in Toritama), also known as Wilson Surubim, is a Brazilian footballer who currently plays as a midfielder for Sociedade Esportiva Ypiranga Futebol Clube.

The Brazilian Football Confederation revealed that Wilson Surubim had tested positive for doping (Prednisolone) while playing for Confiança in the Campeonato Brasileiro Série C on 8 October 2008.

References

External links

1980 births
Living people
Brazilian footballers
Association football midfielders
Guarani FC players
Clube Náutico Capibaribe players
Santa Cruz Futebol Clube players
Sportspeople from Pernambuco